Exist may refer to:

 Existence

 eXist, an open source database management system built on XML
 Existential quantification, in logic and mathematics (symbolized by ∃, read "exists")
 Energetic X-ray Survey Telescope, a proposed hard X-ray imaging all-sky deep survey mission
 Exists (band), formerly Exist, a Malaysian band
 Exists (film), a 2014 horror film
 XIST (gene) X inactive specific transcript, a gene which inactivates extra copies of X-chromosomes.

See also
 Existentialism
 Existence (disambiguation), for other meanings of "existence" and "existential"